Chaver may refer to:

Chaber (also spelled chaver), a Hebrew term meaning "associate", "friend", or similar
Chaver, a Malayalam term meaning "martyrs" or "suicide attackers"

People with the surname Chavers include:
P.W. Chavers (1876–1933), African-American businessman and journalist
Dean Chavers (born 1941), Native American educationalist

See also
 Mamankam festival#Tradition of chavers
 Charver, a term for "chav" in Northern England